Moral Panic is the third studio album by English alternative rock band Nothing but Thieves. The album was released on 23 October 2020 through Sony Music UK. The album was produced by Mike Crossey, with band member Dominic Craik also producing five songs.

Background
The band started composing the songs for the album in the early 2019. Although its release coincided with Covid-19 pandemic and a lot of related anxiety and tension in the society, the idea for the album (including its title and even the first single, Is Everybody Going Crazy?) came prior to that and took inspiration from various social issues in the world.

Release and promotion

Singles
The album was preceded by five singles: lead single "Is Everybody Going Crazy?", released on 18 March 2020; "Real Love Song", released on 23 June 2020, "Unperson", released on 28 August 2020, "Impossible", released on 14 September 2020, and "Phobia", released on 16 October 2020.

Music videos
The music video for "Is Everybody Going Crazy?" premiered on the band's YouTube channel on 25 March 2020. The video was directed by Remi Laudat and co-produced by Juliette Larthe, Chris Murdoch and Yssis McKen. The video features the band in grey rainsuits performing in a dark room with cameras running at various angles and vantage points. On 10 August 2020, "Real Love Song" premiered on the band's YouTube and Vevo channels.

Moral Panic: The Complete Edition
On 29 October 2021, a deluxe version of the album was released comprising the 11 songs from the standard edition with the addition of the five songs from the band's Moral Panic II EP.

Track listing
All songs written by Conor Mason, Joe Langridge-Brown and Dominic Craik, except tracks 4, 5, 7, 8 & 9 by Conor Mason, Joe Langridge-Brown, Dominic Craik, Jim Irvin & Julian Emery.

Personnel
Credits adapted from Tidal.

Nothing but Thieves
 Philip Blake – bass guitar
 Dominic Craik – guitar, programming (all tracks); producer (1, 3–5, 11)
 Joe Langridge-Brown – guitar 
 Conor Mason – vocals
 James Price – drums

Technical
 Mike Crossey – programming, producer, mixing engineer
 Robin Schmidt – mastering engineer
 Stephen Sesso – engineer

Artwork
 Steve Stacey – art direction, design
 Tom Andrew – photography

Charts

In popular culture
The single "Unperson" is featured in the racing simulation game Forza Horizon 5 in the "Horizon XS" radio station.

References

2020 albums
Nothing but Thieves albums
Albums produced by Mike Crossey
Sony Music UK albums